A Knight in London is a 1928 British-German silent drama film directed by Lupu Pick and starring Lilian Harvey, Ivy Duke and Robin Irvine. It was one of a significant number of co-productions between the two countries in the late 1920s. The film's direction and the cinematography by Karl Freund were widely praised.

Cast
Lilian Harvey as Aline Morland
Ivy Duke as Lady Morland
Robin Irvine as Harry Erskine
Bernard Nedell as Prince Zalnoff
Robert English as Mr. McComber
Kenneth Rive as Boy
Zena Dare
Harry Nestor

References

External links

British drama films
British silent feature films
German drama films
German silent feature films
Films of the Weimar Republic
1928 drama films
Films shot at British International Pictures Studios
Films directed by Lupu Pick
Films set in London
British black-and-white films
German black-and-white films
Films scored by Eduard Künneke
Silent drama films
1920s German films